Nathan Mark Stoneman (born 17 September 1996) is a speedway rider from Wales.

Career
Stoneman began his speedway career in 2012 with the Mildenhall Fen Tigers, where he picked up a league and cup double as the team dominated the 2012 National League speedway season. The following season he remained with the Tigers for the 2013 National League speedway season. 

After a lengthy break he returned to speedway in 2016 when he joined the Isle of Wight Islanders. In 2017, he joined the Kent Kings but also made several appearances for the Sheffield Tigers in the higher division.

In 2019, he rode for the Birmingham Brummies and Somerset Rebels before taking another break. In 2022, he rode for the Berwick Bandits in the SGB Championship 2022 and Oxford Chargers during the 2022 National Development League speedway season. He enjoyed a successful season helping Oxford eventually reach the play offs but suffered suffered a broken shoulder blade which prevented further participation. 

In 2023, he re-signed for Berwick for the SGB Championship 2023 but also remained with the Chargers for the 2023 NDL season.

References 

1996 births
Living people
British speedway riders
Welsh speedway riders
Berwick Bandits riders
Birmingham Brummies riders
Isle of Wight Islanders riders
Mildenhall Fen Tigers riders
Plymouth Gladiators speedway riders
Sheffield Tigers riders
Somerset Rebels riders